Teralatirus funebris is a species of sea snail, a marine gastropod mollusk in the family Fasciolariidae.

References

Fasciolariidae
Gastropods described in 1907